The 1928–29 Montana State Bobcats men's basketball team represented Montana State University during the 1928–29 NCAA men's basketball season in the United States. The head coach was Schubert R. Dyche, coaching in his first season with the Bobcats. The team finished the season with a 36–2 record and was retroactively named the national champion by the Helms Athletic Foundation and the Premo-Porretta Power Poll. They defeated Amateur Athletic Union champion Cook's Painters in a best-of-three series. This team was later nicknamed the "Golden Bobcats" and is now a prominent part of the lore for the men's basketball program at Montana State University.

This Montana State squad is considered one of the best college teams in the first half of the 20th century. The 1928–29 season was a culmination of the entire decade in which the school revolutionized a fast break offense coupled with high-pressure defense, something that no other teams had ever done. Players John "Cat" Thompson and Frank Ward were named consensus All-Americans at the end of the season, and Thompson was later inducted into the Naismith Memorial Basketball Hall of Fame.

References

Montana State Bobcats men's basketball seasons
NCAA Division I men's basketball tournament championship seasons
Montana State
Montana State Bobcats Men's Basketball Team
Montana State Bobcats Men's Basketball Team